Chang Hsing-hsien (2 October 1909 – 14 March 1989) was the first Taiwanese athlete participated in the Olympic Games.

He was born in Taichung County, Taiwan.  He competed under the Japanese name Seiken Cho, as Taiwan was part of the Japanese Empire at the time.  He represented Japan at the 1932 and 1936 Summer Olympics.

References

External links
 

1909 births
1989 deaths
Athletes (track and field) at the 1932 Summer Olympics
Athletes (track and field) at the 1936 Summer Olympics
Olympic athletes of Japan
Sportspeople from Taichung
Taiwanese people of Hoklo descent